The Wonder-Smith and His Son: A Tale from the Golden Childhood of the World is a children's book by Ella Young. It is a collection of fourteen stories about Gubbaun Saor, the legendary Irish smith and architect. The book, illustrated by Boris Artzybasheff, was first published in 1927 and was a Newbery Honor recipient in 1928.

References

External links
 Full text of The Wonder Smith and His Son at HathiTrust Digital Library

1927 short story collections
Children's short story collections
American children's books
Newbery Honor-winning works
Irish mythology
1927 children's books